DFQ can refer to:

 Dongfeng District, a district of Jiamusi, China; see List of administrative divisions of Heilongjiang
 Nudiviridae, a family of viruses that infect insects and crustaceans, per Catalogue of Life identifier
 Differential equation, a type of mathematical equation that relates a function to its derivative(s)
 domi forisque, as abbreviated; see List of medieval abbreviations